Raipur Institute of Medical Sciences (RIMS) is a medical school located in Raipur, Chhattisgarh, India. Established in 2012, RIMS is managed by the Lord Buddha Education Society. It is affiliated to Pt. Deendayal Upadhyay Memorial Health Sciences and Ayush University of Chhattisgarh, Raipur.

Academics
Currently, the institute offers M.B.B.S. with an intake capacity of 150 per batch.

References

Medical colleges in Chhattisgarh
Education in Raipur, Chhattisgarh
Colleges affiliated to Pt. Deendayal Upadhyay Memorial Health Sciences and Ayush University of Chhattisgarh
2012 establishments in Chhattisgarh
Educational institutions established in 2012